Villeneuve-lès-Maguelone (Occitan: Vilanòva de Magalona) is a commune in the Hérault department in the Occitanie region in Southern France. Villeneuve-lès-Maguelone station has rail connections to Narbonne, Montpellier and Avignon.

Etymology
The name Maguelone is a variation of Latin "margarita" (pearl), from Persian "margaritis" - in modern French the "marguerite" (daisy) took its name from the precious stone. The ending is probably a misattribution: "-ita" is a common Romance feminine diminutive suffix, equivalent in meaning to the Occitan "-ona".

History

Maguelone (or Maguelon) was one of the "seven cities" that may have been the origin of the name for the region called Septimania. Septimania was the western region of the Roman province of Gallia Narbonensis, which passed under the control of the Visigothic kingdom in 462, when Septimania was ceded to Theodoric II, king of the Visigoths. The seven cities were today's Elne, Agde, Narbonne, Lodève, Béziers, Nîmes and Maguelone.

In the aftermath of the Battle of Vouille (507), Maguelone managed to remain out of Frankish sway, and was part of the Visigothic kingdom. At first the stronghold of a Visigothic noble, on high ground protected by coastal lagoons, Maguelone became the seat of a bishop. When the early history of Maguelone was compiled in 1583 by Abbé Gariel (Histoire des évêques de Maguelonne) he provided the see with an apostolic origin, as is de rigueur for any long-established bishopric of Late Antiquity throughout the three Gauls. The first historical bishop of Maguelonne, Boetius, assisted at the Council of Toledo in 589; doubtless the Christian community was far older.

In the 8th century (circa 725) the Umayyad forces conquered the area, but the stronghold was destroyed by Charles Martel in his 737 campaign across Septimania, almost depopulating the region. The Gallo-Roman and Gothic nobility allied with the Andalusian military kept the position until 752, when Pepin the Short tipped the scale in favour of the Franks, who conquered Septimania.

The diocese was removed to Substantion (Sextantio), but Bishop Arnaud (1030–1060) returned it, rebuilt the destroyed sanctuary and constructed a bridge to link Maguelone to the "new district" of Villeneuve.  The powerful and compact Romanesque Maguelone Cathedral, dedicated to Saint Peter, was constructed.

The local count retained the traditional Carolingian right of nomination of bishops: in 1085 Pierre, count of Substantion and Melgueil, offered himself as vassal of the Holy See and relinquished the right of nomination, and Innocent III transferred the feudal rights of the county to the bishop of Maguelonne in 1215, which gave the bishops the right to issue coinage. The bishop, as well as the King of Aragon and the Count of Toulouse, authorized the coinage of Arabic money, not intended for circulation in Maguelonne, but to be sold for exportation to the merchants of the Mediterranean.

With the expansion of trade in the revival of the High Middle Ages, Montpellier came to be the city for this region, first passing to the Crown of Aragon in 1204, then to that of France (1292 and 1349). In 1536 the see was finally transferred there.

A sentimental and chivalric romance of the high-born Miguelonne and Pierre, the son of the King of Provence, who recognized each other in their old age after many heartbreaking separations, inspired a verse: Epistle by Clément Marot.

For the history of the bishopric of Maguelonne, see Bishopric of Montpellier as the episcopal see was transferred there in 1536

Geography

Climate
Villeneuve-lès-Maguelone has a mediterranean climate (Köppen climate classification Csa).

Population

Sights
 In the city:
 12th century church Saint-Étienne.
 Around the city:
 Mountain of the Madeleine: shrubland, army ground, ruin of the Saint-Baudille vault at the top (185 m), and stele commemorating the French Resistance fighters shot during the Second World War.
 Estagnol National Nature Reserve, a marsh between scrubland and vine.
 In the outskirts:
 Romanesque Maguelone Cathedral
 Public beach: The sand dunes extend from Palavas-les-Flots to Frontignan-Plage. Some sections of the beach are not accessible by automobile and thus popular with naturists.
 Ponds: fishing, bird watching.
 The Canal du Rhône à Sète allows river tourism between the Rhône, the étang de Thau, and the Canal du Midi.

See also
 Notre-Dame des Tables de Montpellier
Communes of the Hérault department

References

External links

City council website, in French
National Institute of Statistics and Econimc Studies, in French

Communes of Hérault